Oberea formosana is a species of longhorn beetle in the tribe Saperdini in the genus Oberea, discovered by Pic in 1911.

References

F
Beetles described in 1911